William Tell (German: Wilhelm Tell) is a 1934 German-Swiss historical drama film directed by Heinz Paul and starring Hans Marr, Conrad Veidt and Emmy Göring. It is based on the 1804 play William Tell by Friedrich Schiller about the Swiss folk hero William Tell. It was made in Germany by Terra Film, with a separate English-language version supervised by Manning Haynes also being released. It was shot at the Marienfelde Studios of Terra Film in Berlin with location shooting in Switzerland. While working on the film Veidt, who had recently given sympathetic performances of Jews in Jew Suss (1934) and The Wandering Jew, was detained by the authorities. It was only after pressure from the British Foreign Office that he was eventually released. It is also known by the alternative title The Legend of William Tell.

Cast
Hans Marr as Guillaume Tell
Conrad Veidt as Gessler
Emmy Göring as Hedwig Tell (credited as Emmy Sonnemann)
Olaf Bach as Arnold von Melchthal
Eugen Klöpfer as Heinrich von Melchtal
Maly Delschaft as Barbara von Melchthal
Theodor Loos as Werner Stauffacher
Franziska Kinz as Gertrud Stauffacher
Carl de Vogt as Konrad Baumgarten
Käthe Haack as gardener
Fritz Hofbauer as Walter Fürst
Detlef Willecke as Walter, Tell's son
Wolfdieter Hollender as little Wilhelm, Tell's youngest son
Werner Schott as Vogt Landenberg
Friedrich Ettel as Advocatus in Wolfenschiessen
Josef Peterhans as Father Rösselmann
Herma Clement as Armgard
Paul Bildt as Schultheiß of Lucerne
Max Hochstetter as Imperial Hauptmann
Willem Haardt as Imperial Hauptmann
Heinrich Schroth as Imperial Hauptmann
Georg H. Schnell as Imperial Stadtholder

See also
William Tell (1923), also with Hans Marr and Conrad Veidt

References

Bibliography

Wood, Linda. British Films, 1927–1939. British Film Institute, 1986.

External links

1930s historical drama films
Swiss drama films
Swiss historical drama films
German historical drama films
Films of Nazi Germany
Swiss German-language films
Films directed by Heinz Paul
Films set in Switzerland
Films set in the 14th century
Films based on works by Friedrich Schiller
German multilingual films
Remakes of German films
Sound film remakes of silent films
German black-and-white films
Cultural depictions of William Tell
1934 multilingual films
1934 drama films
1930s German films
Films shot at Terra Studios